The 1940–41 Boston Bruins season was the Bruins' 17th season in the National Hockey League, and they were coming off of a successful season in 1939–40, leading the NHL in points for the third season in a row, as they finished with a 31–12–5 record, accumulating 67 points.  However, the Bruins lost to the New York Rangers in the NHL semi-finals, ending their chances for a second-straight Stanley Cup. This year, the Bruins repeated as regular-season champs and returned to the Final, and defeated the Detroit Red Wings four games to none to win the organization's third Stanley Cup.

Regular season
Boston would have a slow start to the season, going winless in their first 4 games (0–2–2), and sat with a 6–7–3 record 16 games into the season, fighting with the Chicago Black Hawks and New York Americans for 3rd place in the league. The Bruins would then go on a record breaking unbeaten streak, as they would have a 15–0–8 record in their next 23 games, and sit in 2nd place to the Toronto Maple Leafs.  After a 2–0 loss to the New York Rangers, Boston would finish the season 6–0–2 to pass the Leafs, and finish with the most points in the NHL for the 4th straight year.  Boston had an amazing 21–1–10 record to close out the season.

Bill Cowley would lead the NHL in scoring with 62 points, as he scored 17 goals and added 45 assists.  Roy Conacher led the Bruins in goals with 24, and added 14 assists for a career high 38 points.  Eddie Wiseman and Bobby Bauer had productive seasons, earning 40 and 39 points respectively, while Milt Schmidt finished with 38.  Team captain Dit Clapper led the Boston blueline with 26 points, while Flash Hollett led the Bruins defense with 9 goals.

In goal, Frank Brimsek had another outstanding season, winning 27 games, while earning 6 shutouts and posting a 2.01 GAA.

Final standings

Record vs. opponents

Schedule and results

Playoffs
In the playoffs, Boston would have a first-round bye, advancing straight to the NHL semi-finals, where they would face the second place Toronto Maple Leafs in a best of seven series.  The Bruins finished 5 points ahead of the Leafs during the regular season.  The series opened at the Boston Garden, with each team winning a game, before moving to Maple Leaf Gardens for games three and four.  The Leafs took a 2–1 series lead with a big 7–2 victory, however, Boston evened the series up at two games each with a solid 2–1 win in game four.  Game 5 shifted back to Boston, but it was Toronto who took a 3–2 series lead, with a 2–1 overtime victory.  The series moved back to Toronto for the 6th game, and with Boston facing elimination, the Bruins would hold off the Leafs for a 2–1 win to force a 7th and deciding game in Boston.  The Bruins once again would fend off Toronto, hanging on for a 2–1 win, to take the series 4–3, and earn a spot in the Stanley Cup final.

The Bruins opponent was the Detroit Red Wings, who finished the regular season with 53 points, 14 less than Boston.  Detroit had defeated the New York Rangers and Chicago Black Hawks to earn a spot in the final. The series opened in Boston, with the Bruins winning the first 2 games by close scores of 3–2 and 2–1 to take a 2–0 series lead.  The series moved to the Detroit Olympia for the next 2 games, but Boston would complete the sweep, winning games 3 and 4 by scores of 4–2 and 3–1 to become the first team in NHL history to sweep a 4-game series, and win their 2nd Stanley Cup in 3 seasons, and their 3rd in franchise history.  It was also the last time the Bruins would win the Stanley Cup until 1970.

Boston Bruins 4, Toronto Maple Leafs 3

Boston Bruins 4, Detroit Red Wings 0

Player statistics

Regular season
Scoring

Goaltending

Playoffs
Scoring

Goaltending

Awards and records
 Prince of Wales Trophy:  Boston Bruins
 Hart Memorial Trophy:  Bill Cowley
 Lady Byng Memorial Trophy:  Bobby Bauer
 Frank Brimsek, Goaltender, NHL Second Team All-Star
 Bobby Bauer, Right Wing, NHL Second Team All-Star
 Woody Dumart, Left Wing, NHL Second Team All-Star
 Dit Clapper, Defence, NHL First Team All-Star
 Bill Cowley, Centre, NHL First Team All-Star
 Cooney Weiland, Coach, NHL First Team All-Star

References

 National Hockey League Guide & Record Book 2007

Boston Bruins
Boston Bruins
Boston Bruins seasons
Stanley Cup championship seasons
Boston Bruins
Boston Bruins
1940s in Boston